Sandwiches That You Will Like is a 2002 PBS documentary by Rick Sebak of WQED.  The unique sandwich offerings of cities across the United States (although excepting two from California, the remaining sandwiches all originate no further west than Texas) are shown, from those that are often found outside of their city of origin (cheesesteak from Philadelphia) to the virtually unknown (St. Paul in St. Louis).

The sandwiches showcased are:
Tripe — George's, Italian Market, Philadelphia, Pennsylvania
The Elvis — Peanut Butter & Co., New York City, New York (retail shop closed in 2016)
Beef on weck — Schwabl's, West Seneca, New York
Roast beef — Kelly's Revere Beach, Revere, Massachusetts
French dip — Philippe's, Los Angeles, California
Italian beef — Mr. Beef, Chicago, Illinois
Loose meat — Taylor's Maid-Rite, Marshalltown, Iowa
Cheesesteak — Dalessandro's, Roxborough, Philadelphia; Geno's and Pat's, South Philadelphia
Pig ears and snouts — C & K Barbecue, St. Louis, Missouri
Brain — Ferguson's, St. Louis (listed as permanently closed on Menu Pix website)
St. Paul — Kim Van, St. Louis
Bánh mì — Huong Lan, San Jose, California; Lucy Sheets, outside My Ngoc, Pittsburgh, Pennsylvania
Primanti — Primanti Brothers, Pittsburgh
Chipped ham — Isaly's, West View, Pennsylvania
Hot Brown — Brown Hotel, Louisville, Kentucky
Lobster roll — Red's Eats, Wiscasset, Maine
Po' boy — Domilise's Restaurant, New Orleans, Louisiana
Muffuletta — Central Grocery, New Orleans
Barbecue — Thelma's, Houston, Texas
Falafel — Sepal, Massachusetts Institute of Technology, Cambridge, Massachusetts
Pastrami — Katz's Deli, New York City

See also

 List of American sandwiches
 List of sandwiches

Notes

External links

Sandwiches That You Will Like at IMDB.com
Google Map of the locations listed above

American sandwiches
American documentary television films